Marklohe is a former Samtgemeinde ("collective municipality") in the district of Nienburg, in Lower Saxony, Germany. Its seat was in the village Marklohe. It was disbanded on 1 November 2021, when it was merged with the Samtgemeinde Liebenau to form the new Samtgemeinde Weser-Aue.

The Samtgemeinde Marklohe consisted of the following municipalities:
 Balge 
 Marklohe
 Wietzen

References

Former Samtgemeinden in Lower Saxony